Inverkeithing Town House is a municipal building in the Townhall Street, Inverkeithing, Fife, Scotland. The structure, which is used as a base by members of the local community council, is a Category A listed building.

History
The first municipal building in the town was a tolbooth which dated back at least to the mid-16th century. Six women were accused of witchcraft and incarcerated there in 1621. By the mid-18th century, the tower of the old tolbooth was at risk of collapse and the burgh leaders decided to demolish the old tower and to erect a new one in its place. The new tower was designed by John Monroe in the Renaissance style, built in coursed sandstone and was completed in 1755. However, by December 1769, the main section of the tolbooth was also in a dilapidated state and the burgh leaders decided to demolish this as well and to erect the main section of a new town house on the same site. The main section was designed by George Monroe in the neoclassical style, also built in sandstone and was completed in 1770.

The four-stage tower featured a round headed doorway with pilasters, voussoirs and a keystone in the first stage and a small window with voussoirs and a keystone in the second stage. The second stage was surmounted by a pediment containing the burgh coat of arms in the tympanum. There was a small blind panel on brackets in the third stage and an octagonal belfry surmounted by a dome and a weather vane in the fourth stage. The design for the main section involved an asymmetrical main frontage with four bays facing onto Townhall Street; the second bay from the left featured a doorway flanked by pilasters supporting a cornice and the fourth bay featured a pend leading to St Peter's churchyard behind. The first floor was fenestrated by four evenly spaced sash windows with architraves and the second floor was fenestrated by four evenly spaced small square windows with wrought iron grills. Internally, the principal rooms were the prison for petty criminals on the ground floor, the courtroom on the first floor and the prison for debtors on the second floor. 

The building continued to serve as the meeting place of the burgh council for much of the 20th century, but ceased to be the local seat of government when the enlarged Dunfermline District Council was formed in 1975. The town house subsequently became the meeting place of Inverkeithing Community Council and a venue for councillors' surgeries.

A major programme of restoration works, which involved repairs to the external masonry and the installation of a lift, was initiated with financial support from Fife Council, the National Lottery Heritage Fund, Historic Environment Scotland and the Scottish Government in June 2022. The work, which is being carried out by Ashwood Scotland to a design by ARC architects, will enable the building to be used as a community hub and is due to be completed in February 2023.

See also
 List of listed buildings in Inverkeithing, Fife
 List of Category A listed buildings in Fife

References

Government buildings completed in 1770
City chambers and town halls in Scotland
Category A listed buildings in Fife
Inverkeithing